BIG Memsaab is a reality show aired on Reliance Broadcast Network Limited’s regional channel BIG Magic. It provides housewives from central India a platform to showcase their skills, personality, creativity and talent. BIG Memsaab is a knock-out show wherein one contestant is eliminated at the end of every episode. It is judge by  Sambhavna Seth ,  and Karishma Tanna with current host Pritam Singh. BIG Memsaab also has a Punjabi version called BIG Punjaban which airs on the Spark Punjabi. This is the flagship show for the channel with most number of seasons and has recently ended its seventh season on 12 July 2013.

Show Host and Co-Host 
Season 5 - Host: Natasha Sharma; Co-host: Manish Goel
Season 6 & Season 7 - Host: Parul Chauhan;

Co-Host: Priyesh Sinha

References

Indian reality television series
Big Magic original programming
2013 Indian television series debuts